The Nantou County Government is the local government of Nantou County, Taiwan.

History
The county government was established on 21 October 1950.

Administrative divisions
 Police Bureau
 Fire Bureau
 Environmental Protection Bureau
 Tax Bureau
 Cultural Affairs Bureau

See also
 Nantou County Council

References

1950 establishments in Taiwan
Government agencies established in 1950
Local governments of the Republic of China
Nantou County